Zohaib is a given name. Notable people with this name include:

 Zohaib Kazi (born 1984), Pakistani musician, composer, lyricist, and record producer
 Zohaib Khan (born 1984), Pakistani cricketer
 Zohaib Ahmed (born 1986), Pakistani cricketer
 Zohaib Shera (born 1990), Pakistani cricketer
 Zohaib Asghar, Pakistani actor

See also 
 Zoheb